Calliphora quadrimaculata, commonly known as the New Zealand blue blowfly and by its Māori name rango pango, is an insect in the genus Calliphora of family Calliphoridae in the order Diptera. This particular blowfly is found throughout New Zealand as well as on Chatham, Auckland, Stewart and Campbell Islands that surround New Zealand. Generally blowfly maggots in New Zealand have to feed on animal tissue or faeces to develop into adult blowflies. However the New Zealand blue blowfly larvae can survive on decaying leaves of snow tussock in alpine regions and reach adult maturity without feeding on any animal tissue.

Description

Immature morphology

The blue blowfly larvae are made up of a head, three thoracic segments and eight abdominal segments. The head is often so small it is hidden in the thoracic segment it has two lobes, a pair of antennae and also a pair of maxillary palps which are bristle like hairs attached to the mouthparts of the larvae that serve as an additional sensory structure.  The mouth is situated at the lower front part of the head and has a pair of hardened mouth hooks. The oral sclerite in the Calliphora quadrimaculata is short compared to other species in the same family. On the first thoracic segment has a pair of spiracles and the rest of the body segments are separated by narrow spines which are very large in the C. quadrimaculata this is seen as a key identifying feature in larval stage.

Mature morphology
The adult New Zealand blue blowfly is New Zealand's largest native blowfly with body lengths of 9.5–15.0 mm. It has a head, thorax and abdomen and a pair of wings. The head is holoptic in males meaning that the eyes meet on the mid front line of the head and in females the head is dichoptic meaning the two eyes are separated. Eyes are densely haired in both male and female. The thorax has very large orange spiracles which are essentially holes that serve as the insect's respiratory system. The thorax is mostly a black except on the scutellum which is the lower part of the thorax on the dorsal side which is a brownish colour. The mesonotum which are middle sclerotized plates on the dorsal surface of the thorax are evenly grey dusted. The bases of the wings are darkened with a brown tinge and the veins are brown. There are six legs the femoral part are blackish brown with a thin grey dusting and the tibiae are a reddish brown. The abdomen is ground colour black with no dusting it has reflections that are metallic violet or blue green in colour.

Distribution 
The New Zealand blue blowfly is endemic to New Zealand (only native to New Zealand). It is found throughout New Zealand as well as on Chatham, Auckland, Stewart and Campbell Islands that surround New Zealand. The specimens found on Auckland and Campbell Islands differed slightly from the mainland species by having a blue green metallic instead of a violet metallic on the abdomen.

Habitat preferences 
As this species is found throughout New Zealand it can happily live anywhere although it does have a preference for mountain type areas where snow tussock is present in particular in the South Island mountain ranges and Stewart Island. It is also known to be a species that contributes to fly strike in sheep. While it is not a species that initiates fly-strike, it can be a secondary candidate so may be found on farmland areas as well. This particular species is hardly ever found indoors.

Life cycle and phenology
New Zealand blowflies have a relatively short life cycle essentially the female deposits her eggs in a medium, with C. quadrimaculatathe medium doesn't have to be a decaying carcass it can be decaying leaf matter. After 24 hours the eggs hatch into larvae; there are three growth stages of larval development and during this period the larvae feed on either plant or animal tissues. After a period of eight days the larva stops feeding and leaves the area to develop into a pupa; this can be done under where larvae were feeding or a close distance away approximately 3 cm below in soil where conditions are dry. The larvae empty what contents they have in their stomachs and contract to form pupae. Approximately two weeks after pupa development an adult fly is formed ready to mate. Female blowflies have a pre-egg laying period of 4–7 days and only live for approximately 2–3 weeks; in this time around 600–800 eggs are deposited, in total the whole cycle is about 20–25 days in length from egg to egg. The New Zealand blue blowfly predominately mates over the summer months, in particular February, because it relies on warmer temperatures for egg to adult development.

Diet and foraging
New Zealand blue blowflies feed on mostly decaying carcasses and decaying plant tissues. This species of blowfly are also known to pollinate species of Hebe in alpine regions so nectar from the flowers may be another source of diet.

Predators, parasites, and diseases
Calliphora quadimaculata have several different predators that include fish, spiders, frogs other bigger insects and birds. There was no sufficient evidence found of parasites and diseases affecting the New Zealand blowfly however they are known to be vectors for disease for conditions such as dysentery and can transfer bacterial infections from animals to humans.  Additionally myiasis is the parasitic condition where maggots from blowflies are living in the tissue of animals and although C. quadrimaculata is not the primary cause of myiasis (other blowflies are) it can be a secondary source.

Facts
In terms of crime scene investigations a blowfly has the ability to get into dead buried corpses under the ground. Blowflies can create useful evidence during postmortem intervals of crimes, especially at murder investigations. Forensic investigators look to find decay that has induced blowflies to the corpse. Blowflies can only live in a certain temperature, so forensic scientists can use the temperature as a measure on and around the body to use for evidence or judgement with murder cases.

References

Calliphoridae
Diptera of New Zealand
Insects described in 1787
Endemic fauna of New Zealand
Endemic insects of New Zealand